Mieczysław B. Biskupski is a Polish-American historian and political scientist, with focus on Central European (particularly Polish) history and international relations.

He has held professorship appointments at St. John Fisher College, the University of Rochester, and the University of Warsaw. In 1997 he was a Fellow of the Central European University in Budapest, Hungary. Since 2002 he is the Endowed Chair in Polish and Polish-American Studies at Central Connecticut State University.

He received his Ph.D. in 1981 from Yale University.

Biskupski's academic and national awards include listing on the Honor Roll of Polish Learning by the Polish Ministry of Education (2001), and the Officer's Cross of the Order of Merit of the Republic of Poland (2000). In 2004 he received the Mieczysław Haiman Award from the Polish American Historical Association. He is a member of the board of directors of the Polish Institute of Arts and Sciences of America; and has served as a member of the board of directors of the Józef Piłsudski Institute of America, and as president of the Polish American Historical Association.

He is the author of several books and numerous articles.

Works

Independence Day: Myth, Symbol, and the Creation of Modern Poland (2012)

References

Dr. Biskupski 
CCSU Polish Studies Scholar M.B. Biskupski       Presented with Prestigious Haiman Award for Scholarship 

American people of Polish descent
Yale Graduate School of Arts and Sciences alumni
University of Rochester faculty
Central Connecticut State University faculty
Living people
Historians of Polish Americans
21st-century American historians
21st-century American male writers
Year of birth missing (living people)
American male non-fiction writers